According to the National League of Cities, there are 288 communities in the United States named Fairview, including incorporated places, unincorporated places, housing developments that are not yet incorporated places, and neighborhoods within incorporated places.  Also there are houses or other buildings named Fairview. These include:

Places called Fairview
(by state)
Fairview, Alabama
Fairview, California
Fairview (Delaware City, Delaware), listed on the National Register of Historic Places
Fairview (Middletown, Delaware), listed on the National Register of Historic Places
Fairview (Odessa, Delaware, 1733), listed on the National Register of Historic Places
Fairview (Odessa, Delaware, 1850), listed on the National Register of Historic Places
Fairview, Georgia
Fairview, Illinois
Fairview, Indiana
Fairview, Iowa
Fairview, Kansas
Fairview, Christian County, Kentucky, on the border of Todd and Christian Counties
Fairview, Kenton County, Kentucky
Fairview (Harrodsburg, Kentucky), listed on the National Register of Historic Places listings in Mercer County, Kentucky
Fairview, Louisiana, Unincorporated community in Concordia Parish
Fairview, Lyon County, Kentucky
Fairview, Anne Arundel County, Maryland
Fairview (Easton, Maryland), listed on the National Register of Historic Places listings in Talbot County, Maryland
Fairview, Frederick County, Maryland
Fairview, Garrett County, Maryland
Fairview, Harford County, Maryland
Fairview, Montgomery County, Maryland
Fairview, Washington County, Maryland
Fairview, Michigan
Fairview Township, Minnesota (disambiguation)
Fairview, Missouri
Fairview, Lincoln County, Missouri
Fairview, Montana
Fairview Township, Holt County, Nebraska
William Jennings Bryan House, also known as Fairview, a U.S. National Historic Landmark in Lincoln, Nebraska
Fairview, Nevada
Fairview, Bergen County, New Jersey
Fairview, Delran, New Jersey in Burlington County
Fairview, Medford, New Jersey in Burlington County
Fairview, Camden, Camden County, New Jersey
Fairview, New Jersey in Gloucester County
Fairview, Monmouth County, New Jersey
Fairview, Dutchess County, New York
Fairview, Westchester County, New York
Fairview, Buncombe County, North Carolina
Fairview, Union County, North Carolina
Fairview, Ohio
Fairview, Adams County, Ohio
Fairview, Oklahoma
Fairview, Oregon
Fairview, Tillamook County, Oregon, an unincorporated community
Fairview, Butler County, Pennsylvania, a borough
Fairview, Erie County, Pennsylvania, a census-designated place
 Fairview, Franklin County, Pennsylvania, an unincorporated community
Fairview Lake (Pennsylvania), a natural lake in Palmyra Township, Pike County
Fairview Township, Pennsylvania (disambiguation)
Fairview Village, Pennsylvania
Fairview, South Dakota
Fairview, Tennessee, a small town in Williamson County
Fairview, Bradley County, Tennessee
Fairview, Tennessee, an unincorporated community in Scott County, Tennessee
Fairview, Wayne County, Tennessee, an unincorporated community
Fairview, Texas
William J. Bryce House, known as Fairview, in Fort Worth, Texas
Fairview, Utah
Fairview (Amherst, Virginia), listed on the National Register of Historic Places
Fairview (Spotsylvania County, Virginia), listed on the National Register of Historic Places
Fairview, West Virginia
Fairview (Burlington, West Virginia), listed on the National Register of Historic Places
Fairview, Wisconsin
Fairview, Wyoming

Other places that include Fairview in name
Fairview Heights, Illinois
Fairview Natural Area, a protected area in Montrose County, Colorado
Fairview Plantation, Collington, Maryland
Fairview Presbyterian Church (disambiguation)
Fairview Training Center, a former state-run institution in Salem, Oregon

Fictional places
 Fairview, the setting of the TV show, Desperate Housewives

See also
Fairview (disambiguation)

.Populated